Giuseppe Bacigalupo (17 December 1744 – 5 August 1821) was an Italian painter active in Liguria.

Biography
He was born in Val Fontanabuona, Tribogna in the region of Liguria. He studied figure painting at the Accademia Ligustica until 1771. With the patronage of Giacomo Gentile, he was able to work and study in Rome from 1772 till 1777. After a start as a history and sacred subject painter, he gravitated to land- and sea-scape painting. He was influenced by a Neapolitan painter by the name of Francesco Decapo, but worked in the studio of Ignazio Unterberger.

After painting landscapes in Naples and Rome, in 1778, he returned to Genoa. In 1792, he was inducted as academic of Merit of the Accademia Ligustica. From 1806-1808, he taught ornamentation. He stopped painting around 1810. His daughter became a painter of landscapes.
His daughter, Rosa Bacigalupi Carrea (1790-1854) was an artist too.

Sources 

1744 births
1821 deaths
Painters from Genoa
18th-century Italian painters
Italian male painters
19th-century Italian painters
Italian landscape painters
19th-century Italian male artists
18th-century Italian male artists